The Electoral district of North Esk was a single-member electoral district of the Tasmanian House of Assembly. It was based near Tasmania's second city of Launceston.

The seat was created in a redistribution ahead of the 1903 state election out of the former seats of Selby and Evandale, and was abolished when the Tasmanian parliament adopted the Hare-Clark electoral model in 1909.

Members for North Esk

References
 
 
 Parliament of Tasmania (2006). The Parliament of Tasmania from 1956

North Esk
1909 disestablishments in Australia